Bill & Boz was an Australian sports television show broadcast on Fox Sports News four nights a week from Sunday to Wednesday. It was hosted by journalist Bill Woods and former Socceroo goalkeeper Mark Bosnich, along with a rotating panel of guests.

The show featured news and discussion of the day's sporting events with the panelists and home viewer feedback. It covered all major Australian sports as well as international sports.

On 4 February 2020, host Bill Woods announced via Twitter that the show had been axed.

Regular panelists

History
The show debuted on 22 January 2017 at 9.30pm as a 1-hour show. From 2018 the show moved to an earlier 9.00pm time slot and extended the run time to 90 minutes, allowing further discussions among the panelists and more home viewer interaction via Twitter, WhatsApp and SMS.

The show aired its 500th episode on 6 August 2019.

See also

List of Australian television series

References

External links
 

2017 Australian television series debuts
English-language television shows
Australian sports television series
Australian television talk shows
Fox Sports (Australian TV network) original programming